Aske or ASKE may refer to:
 Aske (EP), an EP by Burzum
 Aske, North Yorkshire, England
Aske Hall
 ASKE, Association for Skeptical Enquiry
 Α.Σ.Κ.Ε., Fighting Socialist Party of Greece
 Robert Aske (political leader) (1500–1537)
 Robert Aske (merchant) (1619–1689)

See also
 Ask and Embla, the first humans in Norse mythology